Jinshan Yuanqu is a railway station on the Jinshan railway in Jinshan District, Shanghai. It opened as a divergence to the newly-built Pudong Railway on December 9, 2005 as Ruanxiang Railway Station. In 2012 it was renamed to Jinshan Yuanqu and started intercity passenger service on September 28, 2012. The station serves Shanghai Jinshan Industrial Park. Only local trains stop at this station.

References 

Railway stations in Shanghai
Railway stations in China opened in 2005
Stations on the Jinshan railway
Stations on the Pudong railway